Milo Anthony Ventimiglia (born July 8, 1977) is an American actor. Making his screen acting debut on The Fresh Prince of Bel-Air in 1995, he portrayed the lead role on the short-lived series Opposite Sex in 2000 before landing his breakthrough role the following year as Jess Mariano on Gilmore Girls (2001–2007).

Thereafter, he appeared as Chris Pierce on American Dreams (2004–2005) and Richard Thorne on The Bedford Diaries (2006) before starring as Peter Petrelli on Heroes (2006–2010), for which he received nominations for Teen Choice, Saturn and People's Choice Awards. After appearing in main roles on the series Mob City (2013), Chosen (2013), and The Whispers (2015), Ventimiglia began starring as Jack Pearson on This Is Us (2016–2022), for which he has received three nominations for the Primetime Emmy Award for Outstanding Lead Actor in a Drama Series and twice received the Screen Actors Guild Award for Outstanding Performance by an Ensemble in a Drama Series as a cast member.

In film, Ventimiglia made his breakthrough as Rocky Balboa's son in the sixth installment of the Rocky film series, Rocky Balboa (2006), going on to reprise the role in the eighth installment Creed II (2018). He has also appeared in Pathology (2008), That's My Boy (2012), Kiss of the Damned (2013), Grace of Monaco (2014), Devil's Gate (2017), and The Art of Racing in the Rain (2019).

Early life
Ventimiglia was born on July 8, 1977 in Anaheim, California, the youngest child of Carol and Peter Ventimiglia, a Vietnam War veteran. He has two sisters. His father is of Italian-Sicilian descent and his mother is of English and Scottish ancestry. Ventimiglia has a self-described "crooked mouth," having been born with damaged facial nerves causing the left side of his mouth to remain immobile – much like actor Sylvester Stallone, with whom he worked in Rocky Balboa.

Ventimiglia attended El Modena High School in Orange, California. During high school, Ventimiglia wrestled, acted in drama productions and served as student government president, graduating in 1995. At eighteen, Ventimiglia studied at the American Conservatory Theater for their summer program, subsequently attending the University of California, Los Angeles as a theatre major.

Career

Early roles and breakthrough
At eighteen, Ventimiglia pursued an acting career, first starring as a gay teenager in Must Be the Music, a short film released as part of Strand Releasing's Boys Life 2. He enrolled at UCLA before landing a role on The Fresh Prince of Bel-Air, guest starring on television series including CSI: Crime Scene Investigation, Sabrina, the Teenage Witch, Law & Order: Special Victims Unit and Boston Public. He played Jed Perry, in the short-lived Fox TV series, Opposite Sex, which originally aired in 2000.

From 2001 to 2006, Ventimiglia played brooding teen Jess Mariano on Gilmore Girls; he was introduced in the second season as a leading cast member. He signed on for a spin-off of Gilmore Girls called Windward Circle which was to be focused on the relationship between Jess and his estranged father (played by Rob Estes), but the proposed series never made it to air. Afterward, he dropped down to a guest star/recurring cast member, and he came back for four episodes in season four and two episodes in season six. In the third and final season of American Dreams, Ventimiglia played Chris Pierce, the rebellious boyfriend of Meg Pryor (Brittany Snow); Pierce and his single mother, Shelly (Daphne Zuniga), a Playboy bunny, move into the house next to the Pryors. In 2005, he starred in the mid-season replacement series The Bedford Diaries. The producers had only Ventimiglia in mind, but the show lasted only eight episodes and was one of several shows not picked up by the newly formed network The CW.

Heroes; film and production work
In between television work, Ventimiglia had supporting roles in the horror films Cursed (2005), directed by Wes Craven, and Stay Alive (2006), as well as starring roles in the short film Intelligence and the full-length feature Dirty Deeds (2005). The same year, he was cast as Robert "Rocky Jr." Balboa, the son of Rocky Balboa, in the sixth Rocky installment Rocky Balboa which was released in December 2006.

He starred as Peter Petrelli in the NBC series Heroes, a show about "ordinary" people discovering they have superpowers, and portrayed the character until the series' conclusion in 2010. Ventimiglia also produced and developed a mini web-series called It's a Mall World as part of a marketing campaign for American Eagle Outfitters in 2007. In mid-2007 he starred as the love interest of pop/R&B singer Fergie in the music video for "Big Girls Don't Cry". In 2008, he starred as a medical student in the horror film Pathology. The film co-starred Charmed actress Alyssa Milano and was directed by Marc Schölermann for MGM.

In 2005, Divide Pictures created the DSC, or Divide Social Club, an online and global social network for like-minded people co-founded by Ventimiglia with his best friends Russ Cundiff and Dino DeMilio, a radio producer for The Tom Leykis Show. Ventimiglia, Cundiff, and Divide Pictures partnered with Top Cow to produce the comic series REST which will be a monthly limited series. The comic is about John Barrett, a white-collar New Yorker whose life changes when he becomes addicted to a drug that prevents him from falling asleep. Divide also has a comic book called Berserker written by Rick Loverd.

Film and television; This Is Us

After working with writers Mark Neveldine and Brian Taylor on Pathology, Ventimiglia appeared in the pair's next film, Gamer. Ventimiglia also starred in the Xavier Gens apocalypse thriller film, The Divide.

Ventimiglia was the voice of Wolverine in the English dub of the Marvel Anime: Wolverine anime series and reprised his role in an episode of the Marvel Anime: Iron Man and an episode of Marvel Anime: Blade. He did not return to voice Wolverine in Marvel Anime: X-Men, due to that series portraying an older Wolverine, instead Wolverine was voiced by Steven Blum. He played Ned Stax, a former marine, in Frank Darabont's short-lived neo-noir crime drama Mob City for TNT. He also reprised his role as Jess Mariano in Gilmore Girls: A Year in the Life in November 2016. After this, he reportedly told USA Today that, "I hear rumors that they're bringing back everything that I've ever been a part of... I think it's exciting. At times, though, I think it's too much. There are more stories to tell with a lot of these characters, but at the same time some of these characters for some of us actors are more than a decade in the past. It was exciting going back to Gilmore Girls for the four Netflix movies, but I'm satisfied with it. I think the stories were told. I think it was great for the audience and fans to get just one small taste of that world again. But, at the same time, I think people should not get so greedy."

Beginning in the fall of 2016, Ventimiglia starred opposite Mandy Moore in the critically acclaimed NBC period drama series This Is Us playing Jack Pearson, the patriarch of a middle-class family in late 1980s/early 1990s America. Ventimiglia stars in the upcoming suspense thriller Devil's Gate, alongside Amanda Schull. For his role as Jack Pearson, Ventimiglia received his first Emmy nomination in the category Outstanding Lead Actor in a Drama Series.

In 2019, Ventimiglia starred opposite Amanda Seyfried in the film adaptation of The Art of Racing in the Rain, based on the novel by Garth Stein.

Personal life
Ventimiglia and fellow former Gilmore Girls co-star Alexis Bledel were in a relationship from 2002 to July 2006. Ventimiglia also dated his Heroes co-star Hayden Panettiere from December 2007 to February 2009.

Ventimiglia and his sisters were raised as lacto-vegetarians, and he has maintained the diet as an adult. He was named People for the Ethical Treatment of Animals' Sexiest Vegetarian in 2009. He also does not smoke cigarettes or drink alcohol. He is a fan of The Clash as well as The Smiths and Morrissey.

Ventimiglia took a United Service Organization tour in July 2008, in support of American troops in Kuwait, Iraq and Afghanistan.

Filmography

Film

Television

Music videos

Video games

As director

As producer

Writer

Awards and nominations

References

External links

 
 Milo Ventimiglia at the American Film Institute catalog
 

1977 births
20th-century American male actors
21st-century American male actors
American male film actors
American male television actors
People of Sicilian descent
American people of English descent
American people of Scottish descent
American people of Italian descent
Living people
Male actors from Anaheim, California
UCLA Film School alumni